Dr. Mambo's Combo, otherwise known as "The Combo",  is a soul and R&B band that has been playing at Bunker's Music Bar & Grill in downtown Minneapolis since 1987. Original members include Tim Emerson (Dr. Mambo), Margaret Cox, Billy Franze, Bruce Jackson, Michael Bland, Doug Nelson, Stevie Cherewan, Mark Licktieg, and several others. 

The current lineup includes Julius Collins and Margaret Cox on vocals, Sonny Thompson on bass, Brian Ziemniak on keys, Pete Suttman on drums and Geoff LeCrone on guitar. Numerous celebrities and big names in the local music scene have sat in with the band. 

People who have sat in include:
 Prince
 Andre Cymone
 John Mayer
 Sheila E
 Bonnie Raitt
 Jellybean Johnson
 Fred Steele
 Nicholas David
 Jonny Lang
 Dez Dickerson
 Eric Gales
 Larry Graham
 Donny Osmond
 Michael Bolton
 Cory Wong

References

American contemporary R&B musical groups
Musical groups from Minnesota